Lee Yu-bin (born 23 April 2001) is a South Korean short track speed skater. She competed in the 2018 Winter Olympics. and 2022 Winter Olympics, in  Women's 1500 metres, and Women's 3000 metre relay winning a silver medal.

References

2001 births
Living people
People from Bucheon
South Korean female short track speed skaters
Olympic short track speed skaters of South Korea
Olympic gold medalists for South Korea
Olympic silver medalists for South Korea
Olympic medalists in short track speed skating
Short track speed skaters at the 2018 Winter Olympics
Short track speed skaters at the 2022 Winter Olympics
Medalists at the 2018 Winter Olympics
Medalists at the 2022 Winter Olympics
World Short Track Speed Skating Championships medalists
Sportspeople from Gyeonggi Province
21st-century South Korean women